Condominio (Apartment Block) is a 1991 Italian comedy drama film directed by Felice Farina.

For his performance Ciccio Ingrassia won the David di Donatello for best supporting actor.

Cast 

 Carlo Delle Piane: Michele Marrone
 Leda Lojodice: Irene Marrone
 Ottavia Piccolo: Adelaide
 Ciccio Ingrassia: Mar. Gaetano Scarfi
 Anna Lelio: Rosetta Scarfi
 Roberto Citran: Roberto Sgorlon

References

External links

1991 films
Italian comedy-drama films
1991 comedy-drama films
1990s Italian-language films
1990s Italian films